A vaginogram is a medical imaging method in which a radiocontrast agent is injected while X-ray pictures are taken, to visualize structures of the vagina. It has been used to visualize ureterovaginal fistulas.

References

Gynaecology
Medical imaging
Medical physics
Radiology